Brian Mills may refer to:

Brian Mills (footballer) (born 1971), English former footballer
Brian Mills (television director) (1933–2006), British television director
Bryan Mills, the protagonist in the Taken media franchise